Serhiy Shypovskyi (born 2 January 1965) is a retired Ukrainian football goalkeeper.

References

1965 births
Living people
Ukrainian footballers
FC Izhevsk players
PFC Krylia Sovetov Samara players
FC Karpaty Lviv players
FC Shakhtar Donetsk players
FC Tekstilshchik Kamyshin players
Hutnik Nowa Huta players
Pogoń Szczecin players
Association football goalkeepers
Ukrainian expatriate footballers
Expatriate footballers in Russia
Ukrainian expatriate sportspeople in Russia
Expatriate footballers in Poland
Ukrainian expatriate sportspeople in Poland